The South Australian Cricket Association (SACA) is the peak body for the sport of cricket in South Australia. The association administers the Southern Redbacks based in Adelaide. SACA is the controlling body for the South Australian Grade Cricket League. The chairman is Andrew Sinclair.

Introduction
The South Australian Cricket Association (SACA) was formed in 1871 as the "South Australian Cricketing Association" and is the state Cricket body in South Australia. It administers the Grade club cricket competition – the South Australian Grade Cricket League – and the West End Southern Redbacks, South Australia's first-class cricket team as well as, the South Australian Scorpions, the State's women's team in the Women's National Cricket League (WNCL) and Women's T20 (WT20) .

SACA's stated aim is to promote and develop the game of cricket in South Australia.  The SACA has a membership base of more than 28,000 members and an elected Board which governs the activities of the Association.

In 2009, following negotiations with SACA, SANFL and the AFL, Premier Mike Rann announced that the South Australian Government would make an investment of $450 million to redevelop Adelaide Oval in order to improve amenities and enable AFL football to be played there. The following year Treasurer Kevin Foley announced that the government contribution would increase to $535 million. In 2011 53% of SACA members voted in favour of the redevelopment.

In Big Bash League and Women's Big Bash League, it is represented by Adelaide Strikers (Men) and Adelaide Strikers (Women) respectively.

South Australian Grade Cricket League
The SAGCL is the state (metro Adelaide) cricket league of South Australia.  The league administers structured competitions ranging from SACA's Ray Sutton Shield competition for Under 13's through to the West End A Grade competition.

Clubs
There are 13 clubs in the SACA Grade cricket competition.  All clubs field four senior teams and 12 of the clubs (University being the notable exception) have four junior teams competing in regular weekend competitions.

Adelaide Cricket Club (Buffalos)
Northern Districts Cricket Club (Jets)
Southern Districts Cricket Club (Stingrays)
Glenelg Cricket Club (Seahorses)
Sturt Cricket Club (Blues)
Kensington Cricket Club (Browns)
West Torrens Cricket Club (Eagles)
Woodville Cricket Club (Peckers)
Prospect Cricket Club (Pirates)
East Torrens Cricket Club (Reds)
Tea Tree Gully Cricket Club (Bulls)
Port Adelaide Cricket Club (Magpies)
Adelaide University Cricket Club (Blacks)

South Australian Premier League
In 2013, SACA launched the SACA Premier League consisting of four South Australian teams, Papua New Guinea Barramundis and Northern Territory Strike. The league was designed to further expose the top players from the SACA grade competition to better cricket and also offering international development for PNG along with a pathway for players from the Northern Territory. The league was re-named the West End Redbacks League in 2016.

References

External links

Sou
Cric
Cricket in South Australia
1871 establishments in Australia
Sports organizations established in 1871